Tullaghorton is a civil parish in the Barony of Iffa and Offa West, County Tipperary,  Province of Munster Ireland.

See also
 List of civil parishes of County Tipperary

References

External links
 Tullaghorton civil parish, South Tipperary

Civil parishes of Iffa and Offa West